Amal Arafa (born 18 March 1970) is a Syrian actress, singer, and writer. She is the daughter of the well known Syrian composer Suheil Arafa. Amal studied acting in Damascus and learned from her father how to sing. She was married to the actor Abdulmonem Amairy for 14 years, but got divorced in October 2015. They have two daughters, Salma and Mariam.

Series

 Aylet 5 Nojoom (1993)
 Nihayat Rajol Shujaa' (1993)
 Al-Jawareh (1994)
 Hammam al-Quishani (1995)
 Khan al-Harir (1996)
 Bent el-Dorra (1997)
 Al-Tweebi (1998)
 Dounia (1999)
 Akher Ayyam el-Toot (1999)
 Old Times (Al-Khawali) (2000)
 Asrar al-Madina (2001)
 Al-Waseya (2002)
 Sakr Quraysh (2002)
 Zekrayat al-Zaman al-Kadem (2003)
 Spot Light (2004)
 Ashtar (2004)
 Spot Light (2005)
 Deer in the forest of the wolves (2006)
 Kasr al-Khawater (2006)
 Washaa al-Hawa (2006)
 Nada al-Ayyam (2006)
 Time of fear (2007)
 Hassiba (2007)
 Awlad al-Qaymariyah (2008)
 Aswat Khafita (2009)
 Small Hearts (2009)
 Spot Light (2010)
 As3ad al-Warrak (2010)
 Al-Zelzal (2010)
 Takht Sharki (2010)
 Ba3d al-Soqoot (2010)
 Spot Light 8 (2011)
 Kasr el-Aqni3a (2011)
 Al-Za3eem (2011)
 Spot Light 9 (2012)
 Al Meftah (2012)
 Raffet Ein (2012)
 Spot Light 10
 Al Gherbal (parts 1&2)-2014-2015
 sarkhat rouh -2014
 Al Haqa2ib (Dobbou Shanati)
 Al Qorban
 Dunia 2015
Madrasat Al Hobb

Filmography 
 Shay' ma Yahtarek
 So'od el-Matar
 Al-Layl al-Taweel (2009) – (8 Awards: Best Arabic Film in Taormina, India, Cairo...)

Theatre 
 Romeo & Juliette
 Al-Enab al-Hamod
 Al-Karasina
 The Queen Dayfa Khatoon (2008)
 Al Ba7th 3an 3aziza Suleiman (Fujera Festival)

Songs 
 Wen al-Malayeen with Julia Botros and Sawsan Hammami
 Sabah al-Khayr ya Watana
 Ala Ahar men al-Jamor
 Lazem teb'od Anni
 Makan ala Bali
 Ila man Yahommo Amri
 Wa7dak Habibi
 Balak
 Zarani
 Zahab
 Sagheera al Hob
 + Songs of the Series Ashtar & Khan al-Harir
 Enti A7la with Bassel Khayat & Nesreen Tafesh
 Allah Allah (Syrian-Football)
 Dawer 3a 7ali
Nathra Fa Ebtisama

Video clips 
 Ala Ahar men al-Jamor
 Lazem teb'od Anni
 Wa7dak Habibi
 Balak
 Zahab
 Dawer 3a 7ali

Awards 
 Best Performance (Best Singer) in Tunisia for the song 'Zarani'
 Best performance (Best Singer) in the Abu Dhabi Festival of Arab songs, for the song 'Balak'
 Special Jury Prize at the 2003 Arab Song Festival in Rabat
 Best Arabic Actress in 2003 in the Lebanese magazine polls for her role in 'Zekrayat al-Zaman al-Kadem'
 Honored in Lebanon in 2003 for her role in 'Zekrayat al-Zaman al-Kadem'
 Ashtar: The Best Popular Serie in 2004 (starring Amal and written by her)
 Best Syrian Actress in 2006 for her role in 'Ghezlan fi Ghabat al-Zia'ab' & 'Kasr al-Khawater' & 'Washaa al-Hawa'
 Best Arabic Actress in 2006 for her role in 'Ghezlan fi Ghabat al-Zia'ab'
 Best Arabic Actress in 2006 for her role in 'Ghezlan fi Ghabat al-Zia'ab' in the newspaper Al-Thawra
 ADONIA Award: Best Actress in 2007 for her role in 'Zaman al-Khof' and 'Hassiba'
 Honored in the International Women's Day in 2008 for her role in the serie 'Hassiba'
 Honored in Damascus Film Festival 2009
 Innovation Award 2009: Best Actress for her role in 'Homoom Saghira'
 Best Actress in 2010 for her role in 'As3ad al-Warrak' & 'Ba3d al-Soqoot' & 'Takht Sharki' & 'Al-Zelzal' & 'Spot Light'
 ADONIA Award : Best Actress in 2010 for her role in 'Ba3d al-Soqoot'
 Best Comedy Actress in 2011 'Spot Light 9'
 Best Syrian Actress in Madina FM in 2012 for her role in 'Raffet Ein'
Best graphic videoclip for 2014 for "Dawer 3a 7ali".
and more...

References

External links
 

1970 births
Living people
Writers from Damascus
Syrian film actresses
20th-century Syrian women singers
Syrian stage actresses
Syrian television actresses
20th-century Syrian actresses
21st-century Syrian actresses
20th-century Syrian women writers
20th-century Syrian writers
21st-century Syrian women writers
21st-century Syrian writers
21st-century Syrian women singers